Christian Barnekow   (28 July 1837 in Luz-Saint-Sauveur, France – 20 March 1913 in Copenhagen) was a Danish nobleman and composer.

References
This article was initially translated from the Danish Wikipedia.

External links
 Barnekow Piano Trio in f# minor, Op.1 Soundbites and discussion of work.
 

Male composers
1837 births
1913 deaths
19th-century Danish composers
20th-century Danish composers
20th-century Danish male musicians
19th-century Danish male musicians
Barnekow family